Phryganodes lophophoralis is a moth in the family Crambidae. It was described by George Hampson in 1896. It is found in Sikkim, India.

References

Spilomelinae
Moths described in 1896